New Internationalist Left (Nea Diethnistike Aristera (NEDA)) is a Trotskyist political organization in Cyprus. It was affiliated to International Socialist Alternative until 24 June 2021. It is not represented in parliament or other government bodies.

Cypriot national question
NEDA supports the resolution of the national question through the demilitarisation and re-unification of Nicosia and Cyprus. In its own words the party calls for:

 The opening of all the barricades.
 The withdrawal of all the armies.
 The establishment of militias with equal participation of Greek Cypriots and Turkish Cypriots, democratically elected and with members subject to immediate re-call.
 Negotiations to solve difficulties of re-unification, between Greek and Turkish Cypriot workers organizations, trade unions and parties of the left.

This position has been promoted by the party through joint demonstrations of Greek and Turkish Cypriots on either side of the Green Line in Nicosia.

Activities

NEDA campaigns for the rights of migrants and refugees. In 2006, NEDA organised an international solidarity campaign with Kurdish refugees who were to be deported to back to Syria where they would likely be in great danger. Protests were staged in Sweden, Belgium, the UK, Ireland, Greece and Pakistan. The campaign won the right to asylum or to work permits for all 107 refugees.

On 14 November 2012 NEDA organised an anti-austerity protest outside the Ministry of Finance in Nicosia together with the Alliance Against the Memorandum. In the protest NEDA gave out leaflets, which expressed the view that "the EU is trying to burden the workers with the debts from the collapse of the bankers" and that "if this happens, the Cypriot economy and the future of the new generations will then be mortgaged to local and foreign profiteers and usurious bankers".

Youth
The party’s youth wing is Youth Against Nationalism (ΝΕΕ), which is affiliated to Youth against Racism in Europe. NEE produces the newspaper The Wall.

References

External links
New Internationalist Left
Youth Against Nationalism

Communist parties in Cyprus
Euroscepticism in Cyprus